Burkhardt Öller (9 November 1942 – 16 July 2014) was a German football goalkeeper.

Career

In 1966, Öller was discovered by Bundesliga side Eintracht Braunschweig while playing for VfB Peine in the third tier Amateurliga Niedersachsen. He subsequently joined the club's reserve side, and in 1967 was promoted to Eintracht's first team. In Braunschweig Öller was the back-up keeper to West German international Horst Wolter. He left the club in 1971, joining league rivals Hannover 96, before retiring from professional football after one season in Hannover. In total Öller played 30 games during his five seasons in the Bundesliga. He died in July 2014.

References

External links

1942 births
2014 deaths
German footballers
Association football goalkeepers
Bundesliga players
Eintracht Braunschweig II players
Eintracht Braunschweig players
Hannover 96 players